I Am Not Going to Get Up Today! is a children's book written by Theodor Geisel under the pen name Dr. Seuss. It is illustrated by James Stevenson and was published by Random House on October 12, 1987.

Plot
A boy decides to sleep in one day, extolling his deep pillow and warm bed. He boasts that his family, his neighbors, the police, news media and the U.S. Marines can do nothing to rouse him, especially with variety of noisemakers. In the end, his family realizes that he is serious and give his breakfast egg (which he earlier suggested giving back to the hen) to the lone responding policeman, who gladly and immediately eats it on the bedroom floor.

References

American picture books
Books by Dr. Seuss
1987 children's books
Random House books